Auriac is a commune in the Pyrénées-Atlantiques department in the Nouvelle-Aquitaine region of south-western France.

The inhabitants of the commune are known as Auriacois or Auriacoises.

Geography
Auriac is located some 20 km north of Pau just east of Argelos. Access to the commune is by road D834 from Sarron in the north which passes through the commune and continues to Pau in the south. Access to the village is by road D944 from the village to Thèze in the north-west and the D227 from the village to Sévignacq in the south-east. The A55 autoroute passes through the north of the commune with Exit 9 just north-east of the commune giving access to road D834. The commune is mixed forest and farmland.

Places and hamlets

 Alpin
 Baix
 Bernède
 Blanc
 Calot
 Camot
 Cassagne
 Cazaudehore
 Chin
 Cournau
 Duclos
 Fam
 Hourticq
 Laborde
 Madaune
 Maribat
 Moulin de Mugain
 Mounpézat
 Pénouilh
 Périco
 Pierroulou
 Porte
 Poudgé
 Rey
 Ser (forest)

Neighbouring communes and villages

Toponymy

The commune name in béarnais is Auriac. Michel Grosclaude said that the name probably comes from the Latin man's name Aurius with the Gallo-Roman suffix -acum giving "Domain of Aurius".

The following table shows the origin of the commune name:

Sources:

Raymond: Topographic Dictionary of the Department of Basses-Pyrenees, 1863, on the page numbers indicated in the table. 
Grosclaude: Toponymic Dictionary of communes, Béarn, 2006 
Cassini: Cassini Map from 1750

Origins:

Marca: Pierre de Marca, History of Béarn.

History
Paul Raymond noted that Auriac was once an annex of Argelos.

Administration
List of Successive Mayors

Mayors from 1940

Inter-communality
The commune is part of five inter-communal structures:
 the Communauté de communes des Luys en Béarn;
 the SIVU for collective sanitation Auriac-Miossens-Lanusse-Thèze
 the Energy association of Pyrénées-Atlantiques;
 the inter-communal association for the management of drinking water from the Luy-Gabas-Lées;
 the inter-communal association of Garlède-Lalonquette;

Demography
In 2017 the commune had 238 inhabitants.

Culture and heritage

Civil heritage
The commune has a number of buildings and structures that are registered as historical monuments:
A House at Porte (16th century)
A House at Cazaudehore (19th century)
Houses and Farms (16th and 19th centuries)

Religious heritage

The commune has two religious buildings that are registered as historical monuments:
The Parish Church of Saint-François-de-Sales (18th century) (destroyed)
The Parish Church of Saint-François-de-Sales (1885). This church was built in 1885 to replace the old church of the same name which appeared on the Cassini Map. The Church contains many items that are registered as historical objects:
The furniture of the church
A Chasuble (18th century)
A Sun-ray Monstrance (19th century)
2 Altar Candlesticks (19th century)
A Chalice (19th century)
A Prie-dieu (19th century)
A Stoup (19th century)
2 Altars, 4 altar seatings, and 2 Tabernacles (1885)
An Altar, 2 altar seatings, a Tabernacle, and 2 Statues (1885)
3 Stained glass windows of people: Saint Francis de Sales, Saint Michael protecting a canon, and Saint John (1887)

Facilities
Auriac has a primary school which also serves the communes of Garlède-Mondebat, Lalonquette et Miossens-Lanusse in an Educational Inter-communal Grouping.

See also
Communes of the Pyrénées-Atlantiques department

References

External links
Community of communes of Luys en Béarn website 
Auriac on Géoportail, National Geographic Institute (IGN) website 
Auriac on the 1750 Cassini Map

Communes of Pyrénées-Atlantiques